In Breath of Life workshops, linguists help members of Native American communities access and use archival material documenting their ancestral languages in the interest of language restoration and revitalization. 
This is particularly important for the many communities that no longer have fluent speakers of their languages. They are held biannually in June at U.C. Berkeley and at the University of Oklahoma in Norman in even-numbered years, and at the Smithsonian Institution in Washington, DC in odd-numbered years. The project was initiated in the early 1990s at the University of California Berkeley, in part by linguist Leanne Hinton.

Norman, Oklahoma

The Oklahoma Breath of Life, Silent No More Workshop is held at the Sam Noble Oklahoma Museum of Natural History on the campus of the University of Oklahoma in Norman, Oklahoma. It has been funded by grants from the "Documenting Endangered Languages" (DEL) program, a joint project of the  National Science Foundation and the  National Endowment for the Humanities.

The purpose of the workshop is to teach participants how to:

 Find archived language materials
 Read phonetic writing
 Understand how their language works
 Start a database to manage and access their language information
 Begin the process of language and cultural revitalization
 Create fun and interactive teaching materials from old sources

Washington, D.C.

The Breath of Life Institute has been supported by "Documenting Endangered Languages" (DEL), a joint program of the National Science Foundation and the National Endowment for the Humanities. Partners include the National Museum of Natural History, The National Museum of the American Indian, the Library of Congress, The Endangered Language Fund, and Yale University.

References

Further reading 
• Hinton, Leanne (2001). "The Use of Linguistic Archives in Language Revitalization: The Native California Language Restoration Workshop". The Green Book of Language Revitalization in Practice. . 
Language revival
Indigenous languages of the Americas
Native American studies